José Cristiano de Souza Jr.(born 11 August 1977), known as Júnior Paulista  is a Brazilian footballer .

Júnior Paulista briefly played in Campeonato Brasileiro Série A and also played in Série B and Série C.

Biography
Born in Indianópolis neighbourhood of São Paulo city, he started his professional career in Juventus (SP), at that time known as Juninho. He then played for Guarani and Santa Cruz. In 2000, he left for Russia and stayed in Qatar for 1 month.

Palmeiras
In November 2000 he was signed by Palmeiras as the club bought 50% rights and the other retained by investor. However, he was injured and he left for Londrina in 2001 season. In 2002, he signed a 6 months contract with Figueirense. He then returned to Guarani and made his Série A debut. In 2003, he left for Internacional, at that time already known as Júnior and teammate Luiz António Gaino Júnior known as "Júnior Paulista" instead, in although they both came from São Paulo state.

In 2004, he remained in Rio Grande do Sul, but for Caxias. He played 20 out of 23 Série B games of that season.

In January 2005 he left for fellow Campeonato Paulista team União São João, which the team relegated. In May, he extended his contract with Palmeiras to December 2005  and left for Vila Nova until the end of 2005 Série B, however he only played 3 times. After the team failed to qualify to stage two, he left for Pelotas in September, finished as the losing side of the second stage (round of 16) of 2005 Copa FGF.

Série C
In January 2006 he left for Polish side Pogoń Szczecin. After the end of 2005–06 Ekstraklasa he left for Bolivian side Oriente Petrolero.

He returned to Brazil in January 2007, signed a contract with Tupi until the end of 2007 Campeonato Mineiro. In April, he left for Atlético de Alagoinhas for 2007 Campeonato Baiano. In June, he was signed by Joinville until the end of 2007 Campeonato Brasileiro Série C.

He then returned to Rio Grande do Sul, played for São José de Porto Alegre in 2008 Campeonato Gaúcho. In June, he left for Brasil de Pelotas until the end of 2008 Campeonato Brasileiro Série C first stage, which he known as Júnior Paulista at that time. He extended his contract in August. That season Brasil de Pelotas finished as the sixth.

In December, he returned to São José de Porto Alegre for 2009 Campeonato Gaúcho.

China

Honours
 Campeonato Catarinense: 2002
 Campeonato Gaúcho: 2003

References

External links
 
 Futpedia (Profile 2)
 
 Profile at Fidelity Sports Agency 
 
 

1977 births
Living people
Brazilian footballers
Brazilian expatriate footballers
Association football midfielders
Footballers from São Paulo
Ekstraklasa players
Clube Atlético Juventus players
Guarani FC players
Santa Cruz Futebol Clube players
FC Elista players
Sociedade Esportiva Palmeiras players
Londrina Esporte Clube players
Figueirense FC players
Sport Club Internacional players
Sociedade Esportiva e Recreativa Caxias do Sul players
União São João Esporte Clube players
Vila Nova Futebol Clube players
Esporte Clube Pelotas players
Pogoń Szczecin players
Oriente Petrolero players
Tupi Football Club players
Alagoinhas Atlético Clube players
Joinville Esporte Clube players
Esporte Clube São José players
Grêmio Esportivo Brasil players
China League One players
Pudong Zobon players
Tianjin Tianhai F.C. players
Beijing Sport University F.C. players
Expatriate footballers in Russia
Expatriate footballers in Poland
Expatriate footballers in Bolivia
Expatriate footballers in China
Brazilian expatriate sportspeople in Russia
Brazilian expatriate sportspeople in Poland
Brazilian expatriate sportspeople in Bolivia
Brazilian expatriate sportspeople in China